A correlation swap is an over-the-counter financial derivative that allows one to speculate on or hedge risks associated with the observed average correlation, of a collection of underlying products, where each product has periodically observable prices, as with a commodity,  exchange rate, interest rate, or stock index.

Payoff Definition 
The fixed leg of a correlation swap pays the notional  times the agreed strike , while the floating leg pays the realized correlation .  The contract value at expiration from the pay-fixed perspective is therefore 

Given a set of nonnegative weights  on  securities, the realized correlation is defined as the weighted average of all pairwise correlation coefficients :

Typically  would be calculated as the Pearson correlation coefficient between the daily log-returns of assets i and j, possibly under zero-mean assumption.

Most correlation swaps trade using equal weights, in which case the realized correlation formula simplifies to:

The specificity of correlation swaps is somewhat counterintuitive, as the protection buyer pays the fixed, unlike in usual swaps.

Pricing and valuation
No industry-standard models yet exist that have stochastic correlation and are arbitrage-free.

See also
Variance swap
Rainbow option

Sources
 

Derivatives (finance)
Mathematical finance
Banking
Swaps (finance)